The Odisha Legislative Assembly is the unicameral state legislature of Odisha state in India. The seat of the Legislative Assembly is at Bhubaneswar, the capital of the state. The Legislative Assembly is composed of 147 Members of Legislative Assembly.

List of Constitutional Assemblies of Odisha
The following is the list of constituencies of the Odisha Legislative Assembly.

References

Odisha
Constituencies